O. frontalis may refer to:
 Ophiusa frontalis, a synonym for Avatha discolor, a moth species
 Orthotomus frontalis, the rufous-fronted tailorbird, an Old World warbler species

See also
 Frontalis (disambiguation)